Potamonautes obesus is a species of crab in the family Potamonautidae. It is found in Kenya, Malawi, Mozambique, Somalia, Tanzania, Zambia, and Zimbabwe. Its natural habitat is swamps.

References

Potamoidea
Freshwater crustaceans of Africa
Arthropods of Kenya
Arthropods of Malawi
Arthropods of Mozambique
Invertebrates of Somalia
Invertebrates of Zambia
Arthropods of Zimbabwe
Crustaceans described in 1868
Taxonomy articles created by Polbot